Mangra is a county town in Guinan County, Hainan Tibetan Autonomous Prefecture, Qinghai Province, China.

Township-level divisions of Qinghai
Hainan Tibetan Autonomous Prefecture